Rebekah Ann Keller is an American beauty pageant titleholder who was crowned Miss California 1997.  She competed at Miss America 1998, where she won a swimsuit award and finished fourth runner-up.  She later became Miss California USA 2000.

References

Living people
People from Los Angeles
1974 births
Miss America 1998 delegates
Miss America Preliminary Swimsuit winners
American beauty pageant winners